Ion Constantin Inculeț (5 April 1884, Răzeni, Bessarabia Governorate, Russian Empire, now the Republic of Moldova – 18 November 1940, Bucharest, Romania) was a Bessarabian and Romanian politician, the President of the Country Council of the Moldavian Democratic Republic, Minister, full member (since 1918) of the Romanian Academy. He was buried in the Church of St. Ioan Botezătorul of Bârnova, located on the outskirts of Iași. He was married to Princess Roxana Cantacuzino. His children from this marriage were Ion I. Inculeț, Doctor Honoris Causa of the University of Western Ontario (Canada), NASA consultant, Honorary Member of the Romanian Academy, director of the Center of Applied Electrostatics of the University of Western Ontario, and his brother, George I. Inculeț.

Biography 
Ion Inculeț was born on 5 April 1884 in Răzeni village, which became later the inter-war county Lăpușna (cislita-prot), in the family of Constantin and Maria Inculeț.

Education 
He graduated from the primary school in his native village, and in 1894 he was admitted to the Theological School in Chișinău, subordinated to the Theological Seminary, which he graduated with very good grades, obtained the right to be enrolled in the Seminary. He studied in the same year with the future deputies and state dignitaries Vasile Bârcă and Pantelimon Erhan. He was interested to study in a college of exact sciences and was enrolled at the faculty of physics and mathematics of Dorpat University (Estonia), but after a year of studies he transferred to the Saint Petersburg Imperial University, the faculty of physics and mathematics, which he graduated from. with a 1st degree diploma. He had a recommendation for postgraduate studies. During the student years in Petersburg, at his own initiative, the association of Bessarabian students from Petersburg was established.

Career 
After graduating from the university he competed successfully as a private lecturer and worked at several private schools in Petersburg, teaching physics, mathematics and astronomy. In 1917 he was an MP in the Petrograd Soviet from the Socialist Revolutionary Party.

After getting his PhD in 1915, Inculeț worked as a physicist at the Meteorological Observatory, while at the same time, he wrote for the Basarabia newspaper of Constantin Stere.

In April 1917 he returned to Bessarabia, as emissary of the President of the  Provisional Government Alexander Kerensky, in front of a group of 40 Bessarabians, students and teachers from Petrograd, in order to deepen the conquests of the February Revolution.  He was elected to the first parliament of Bessarabia, "The Council of the Country", together with other Bessarabians from Petrograd, from the side of the peasants’ MPs. Initially, Inculeț's political conception was one of political transformation within a democratic and renewed Russia. However, after the Bolsheviks seized power in Petrograd through the October putch, Inculeț evolved into an alliance with Romania.

President of the Moldovan Parliament 

Sfatul Țării, a representative body was formed on 21 November 1917, and Inculeț was chosen in unanimity its president.

Gherman Pântea, the former minister in the Government of the Democratic Republic, and future mayor of Odessa characterized the Inculeț's activity as follows:
"On 21 November 1917 the Country Council was opened, a body that would speak on behalf of Bessarabia and decided its fate. Ion Inculeț was elected president of this parliament unanimously. He met all the qualities to be given this honor: he was calm, skillful, reassuring, and especially extremely patient. (...) Mr. Inculeț in all the circumstances has proved a perfect calm and cold blood. No hasty decisions, no reckless step. The big day was approaching - the day of the Union - but Inculeț was thinking of the peasant's fate. He often said, "If the God would help us with the unification and with the radical agrarian reform, that would mean, to give land to the peasants, I would be the happiest man.""

President of Moldavian Democratic Republic 

On , Sfatul Țării proclaimed the Moldavian Democratic Republic, with Inculeț as president.

Union of Bessarabia with Romania 
On 6 January 1918 the Bolsheviks took over the attempt to take over the Power in Chișinău and Ion Inculeț and Pantelimon Erhan send a telegram to Iasi requesting that the Romanian Army be withdrawn from Bessarabia. He was accused by the Moldovan Bloc, together with Pantelimon Erhan and Gherman Pântea, of a pro-Russian attitude, the latter two resigned.

After Union 
After Union Ion Inculeț was minister of Bessarabia, minister of public health, minister of interior, minister of communications and the vice-president of the Council of Ministers in the Government of Romania, led by Gheorghe Tătărescu (1933-1937).

In 1940, with reference to the fate of Bessarabia and the Union held 1918, he said:
"Bessarabia was forced out of the body of Moldova, with the violation of any right and of any justice, in 1812. The autonomy promised to annexation, with the preservation of the Romanian language in all districts, was rather withdrawn. Bessarabia being slowly transformed into a simple Russian county (gubernya). For one hundred years, the persecution of Czarist Russia lasted - one hundred years of the resistance of this wonderful Moldovan people between Prut and Dniester for keeping the language, for the preservation of the national being. Never during this age has the sacred fire of national consciousness been extinguished. And once the circumstances became favorable, this fire turned into a flame, which consumed as much as possible from the obstacles that were put in the way of the Union with all Romanians."

On , Ioan Simionescu proposed Inculeț to be a member of the Romanian Academy and he was elected as a full member on the meeting which took place the following day. His inaugural speech was named "Space and time in new scientific light" and it talked about the importance of Einstein's 1916 Theory of Relativity.

Together with Pan Halippa, Inculeț founded the Bessarabian Peasants' Party, which militated for land reform in Bessarabia. In 1923, his wing of the party joined the National Liberal Party.

Death 
Inculeț died from a heart attack on 18 November 1940 and was buried at the Bellu cemetery in Bucharest. At the funeral, a speech was given by Vasile Bârcă, who said:  "What characterizes Ion Inculeț’s life and work is his endless modesty and gentleness, his thorough preparation, accompanied by the tact and calm that characterizes him, above all, his warm love of the people, the country, and Bessarabia. of his native, whom he loved with all the powers of his mind and soul."
The remains of Ion C. Inculeț and his spouse, Roxana Cantacuzino, were moved to Bârnova on 7 June 1942. The tombs of Inculeț and his wife are inside the Bârnova church (built 1942–47).

Publications 
 Popular works on physics’ and astronomy in the magazine Scientific Review, Sankt-Petersburg (1911-1916);
 Space and time in the new scientific light (Bucharest, 1920);
 Ma première rencontre avec Saint Aulaire (1930) – in French language;
 U.R.S.S. (Bucharest, 1932);
 An experienced revolution / Ion Inculeț. [composed by Ruxandra Mihaila]. Chișinău: Universitas, 1994.

Gallery

References 

1884 births
1940 deaths
Romanian people of Moldovan descent
People from Ialoveni District
Saint Petersburg State University alumni
Russian Constituent Assembly members
Presidents of Moldova
Presidents of the Moldovan Parliament
People of the Russian Revolution
Deputy Prime Ministers of Romania
Romanian Ministers of Communications
Romanian Ministers of Public Works
Romanian Ministers of Health
Romanian Ministers of Interior
Romanian scientists
Romanian socialists
Titular members of the Romanian Academy
Bessarabian Peasants' Party politicians
National Liberal Party (Romania) politicians
Socialist Revolutionary Party politicians
Burials at Bellu Cemetery
Moldovan physicists
Moldovan MPs 1917–1918
Ministers for Bessarabia